Herring soup is a fish soup consisting of a thick mix of water, barley-meal and red herring.

See also
 List of soups

Notes

Further reading
 
 
 

Fish and seafood soups
Herring dishes
Swedish soups